

2023

 Studio Hosts: Greg Gumbel (New York), Ernie Johnson Jr. (Atlanta), Adam Lefkoe (Atlanta), Adam Zucker (New York/In-game updates), Nabil Karim (In-game updates)
 Studio Analysts: Clark Kellogg, Charles Barkley, Kenny Smith, Wally Szczerbiak (New York), Seth Davis, Jay Wright, Candace Parker (Atlanta)

 Jim Nantz/Bill Raftery and Grant Hill/Tracy Wolfson
 Brian Anderson/Jim Jackson/Allie LaForce
 Ian Eagle/Jim Spanarkel/Evan Washburn
 Kevin Harlan/Dan Bonner and Stan Van Gundy/Lauren Shehadi
 Brad Nessler/Brendan Haywood/Dana Jacobson
 Spero Dedes/Debbie Antonelli/AJ Ross
 Andrew Catalon/Steve Lappas/Jamie Erdahl
 Lisa Byington/Steve Smith and Avery Johnson/Andy Katz
 Tom McCarthy/Avery Johnson/Jon Rothstein (First Four only)

2022

 Studio Hosts: Greg Gumbel and Ernie Johnson Jr. (New York), Nabil Karim (Atlanta), Adam Lefkoe (In-game updates)
 Studio Analysts: Clark Kellogg, Charles Barkley, Kenny Smith, Wally Szczerbiak (New York), Seth Davis, Candace Parker, Dwyane Wade, Rex Chapman (Atlanta)

 Jim Nantz/Bill Raftery and Grant Hill/Tracy Wolfson
 Brian Anderson/Jim Jackson/Allie LaForce
 Ian Eagle/Jim Spanarkel/Jamie Erdahl
 Kevin Harlan/Reggie Miller and Dan Bonner/Dana Jacobson
 Brad Nessler/Brendan Haywood/Evan Washburn
 Spero Dedes/Debbie Antonelli/AJ Ross
 Andrew Catalon/Steve Lappas/Andy Katz
 Lisa Byington/Steve Smith and Avery Johnson/Lauren Shehadi
 Tom McCarthy/Steve Lavin and Avery Johnson/Jon Rothstein (First Four only)

2021

 Studio Hosts: Greg Gumbel (New York), Ernie Johnson Jr. (Atlanta), Adam Zucker (New York/In-game updates), Matt Winer (In-game updates)
 Studio Analysts: Clark Kellogg, Seth Davis, Wally Szczerbiak (New York), Charles Barkley, Kenny Smith, Andy Katz (Atlanta), Candace Parker, Jim Jackson (Final Four)
 Jim Nantz/Bill Raftery and Grant Hill (Sweet 16, Elite 8, Final Four, and National Championship Game)/Tracy Wolfson
 Brian Anderson/Jim Jackson/Allie LaForce
 Ian Eagle/Grant Hill (1st & 2nd Rounds) or Jim Spanarkel (Regionals)/Jamie Erdahl
 Kevin Harlan/Dan Bonner/Dana Jacobson
 Brad Nessler/Steve Lavin and Avery Johnson (First Four only)/Evan Washburn
 Spero Dedes/Brendan Haywood/Lauren Shehadi
 Andrew Catalon/Steve Lappas/AJ Ross
 Carter Blackburn/Debbie Antonelli/Evan Washburn, Dana Jacobson or Lauren Shehadi
 Lisa Byington/Steve Smith/AJ Ross or Lauren Shehadi 
 Tom McCarthy/Avery Johnson/AJ Ross or Lauren Shehadi

2020
This event was cancelled due to the COVID-19 pandemic.
 Studio Hosts: Greg Gumbel and Ernie Johnson Jr. (New York), Adam Zucker (Atlanta), Adam Lefkoe (In-game updates)
 Studio Analysts: Clark Kellogg, Charles Barkley, Kenny Smith (New York), Brendan Haywood, Seth Davis, Candace Parker, Dwyane Wade (Atlanta)

 Jim Nantz/Bill Raftery and Grant Hill/Tracy Wolfson
 Brian Anderson/Chris Webber/Allie LaForce
 Ian Eagle/Jim Spanarkel/Jamie Erdahl
 Kevin Harlan/Reggie Miller and Dan Bonner/Dana Jacobson
 Brad Nessler/Jim Jackson and Steve Lavin (First Four only)/Evan Washburn
 Spero Dedes/Steve Smith and Wally Szczerbiak/Lisa Byington
 Andrew Catalon/Steve Lappas and Steve Lavin (First Four only)/Lauren Shehadi or Lisa Byington (First Four only)
 Carter Blackburn/Debbie Antonelli/John Schriffen

2019

 Studio Hosts: Greg Gumbel and Ernie Johnson Jr. (New York), Casey Stern (Atlanta), Adam Zucker (In-game updates)
 Studio Analysts: Clark Kellogg, Charles Barkley, Kenny Smith, Seth Davis, Wally Szczerbiak, Candace Parker and Brendan Haywood

 Jim Nantz/Bill Raftery and Grant Hill/Tracy Wolfson
 Brian Anderson/Chris Webber/Allie LaForce
 Ian Eagle/Jim Spanarkel/Jamie Erdahl
 Kevin Harlan/Reggie Miller and Dan Bonner/Dana Jacobson
 Brad Nessler/Steve Lavin and Jim Jackson/Evan Washburn
 Spero Dedes/Steve Smith and Len Elmore or Jim Jackson (First Four)/Rosalyn Gold-Onwude
 Andrew Catalon/Steve Lappas/Lisa Byington
 Carter Blackburn/Debbie Antonelli/John Schriffen

2018

 Studio Hosts: Greg Gumbel and Ernie Johnson Jr. (New York), Casey Stern (Atlanta)
 Studio Analysts: Clark Kellogg, Charles Barkley, Kenny Smith, Seth Davis, Wally Szczerbiak, Candace Parker and Brendan Haywood

 Jim Nantz/Bill Raftery and Grant Hill/Tracy Wolfson
 Brian Anderson/Chris Webber/Lisa Byington
 Ian Eagle/Jim Spanarkel/Allie LaForce
 Kevin Harlan/Reggie Miller and Dan Bonner/Dana Jacobson
 Brad Nessler/Steve Lavin/Evan Washburn
 Spero Dedes/Steve Smith and Len Elmore/Rosalyn Gold-Onwude
 Andrew Catalon/Steve Lappas/Jamie Erdahl
 Carter Blackburn/Debbie Antonelli/John Schriffen

2017

 Studio Hosts: Greg Gumbel and Ernie Johnson Jr. (New York), Casey Stern (Atlanta), and Adam Zucker (Final Four)
 Studio Analysts: Clark Kellogg, Charles Barkley, Kenny Smith, Seth Davis, Wally Szczerbiak, Bruce Pearl, Brendan Haywood, and Jay Wright (Final Four)

 Jim Nantz/Bill Raftery and Grant Hill/Tracy Wolfson
 Brian Anderson/Chris Webber or Clark Kellogg (First Four)/Lewis Johnson
 Verne Lundquist/Jim Spanarkel/Allie LaForce
 Kevin Harlan/Reggie Miller and Dan Bonner/Dana Jacobson
 Ian Eagle/Steve Lavin/Evan Washburn
 Spero Dedes/Steve Smith and Len Elmore/Rosalyn Gold-Onwude
 Andrew Catalon/Steve Lappas/Jamie Erdahl
 Carter Blackburn/Mike Gminski and Debbie Antonelli/Lisa Byington

2016
 Studio Hosts: Greg Gumbel and Ernie Johnson Jr. (New York), Matt Winer (Atlanta)
 Studio Analysts: Clark Kellogg, Charles Barkley, Kenny Smith, Seth Davis, Wally Szczerbiak and Swin Cash

 Jim Nantz/Bill Raftery and Grant Hill/Tracy Wolfson
 Brian Anderson/Steve Smith/Dana Jacobson
 Verne Lundquist/Jim Spanarkel/Allie LaForce
 Kevin Harlan/Reggie Miller and Dan Bonner/Lewis Johnson
 Ian Eagle/Chris Webber and Len Elmore/Evan Washburn
 Spero Dedes/Doug Gottlieb/Rosalyn Gold-Onwude
 Andrew Catalon/Steve Lappas/Jamie Erdahl
 Carter Blackburn/Mike Gminski/Jaime Maggio

2015
 Studio Hosts: Greg Gumbel and Ernie Johnson Jr. (New York), Matt Winer (Atlanta)
 Studio Analysts: Clark Kellogg, Charles Barkley, Kenny Smith, Steve Smith, Seth Davis, Mateen Cleaves and Wally Szczerbiak

 Jim Nantz/Bill Raftery and Grant Hill/Tracy Wolfson
 Marv Albert or Brian Anderson/Chris Webber and Len Elmore/Craig Sager or Lewis Johnson (Johnson substituted for Sager when he was on medical leave.)
 Verne Lundquist/Jim Spanarkel/Allie LaForce
 Kevin Harlan/Reggie Miller and Dan Bonner/Rachel Nichols
 Ian Eagle/Doug Gottlieb/Evan Washburn
 Brian Anderson/Steve Smith/Lewis Johnson or Dana Jacobson (Jacobson substituted for Johnson, who was substituting for Sager during his medical leave.)
 Spero Dedes/Mike Gminski/Jaime Maggio
 Andrew Catalon/Steve Lappas/Jamie Erdahl

2014

Note: Steve Kerr joined Jim Nantz and Greg Anthony for the Final Four and national championship game.
 Studio Hosts: Greg Gumbel and Ernie Johnson Jr. (New York), Matt Winer (Atlanta)
 Studio Analysts: Clark Kellogg, Charles Barkley, Kenny Smith, Grant Hill, Seth Davis, Mateen Cleaves and Steve Smith

 Jim Nantz/Greg Anthony/Tracy Wolfson
 Marv Albert/Steve Kerr/Craig Sager
 Verne Lundquist/Bill Raftery/Allie LaForce
 Kevin Harlan/Reggie Miller and Len Elmore/Rachel Nichols
 Ian Eagle/Jim Spanarkel/Lewis Johnson
 Brian Anderson/Dan Bonner/Kristine Leahy
 Spero Dedes/Doug Gottlieb/Jaime Maggio
 Andrew Catalon/Mike Gminski/Otis Livingston

2013

 Studio Hosts: Greg Gumbel and Ernie Johnson Jr. (New York), Matt Winer (Atlanta)
 Studio Analysts: Greg Anthony, Charles Barkley, and Kenny Smith (New York); Rex Chapman, Seth Davis and Steve Smith (Atlanta)

 Jim Nantz/Clark Kellogg/Tracy Wolfson
 Marv Albert/Steve Kerr/Craig Sager
 Verne Lundquist/Bill Raftery/Rachel Nichols
 Kevin Harlan/Reggie Miller and Len Elmore/Lewis Johnson
 Ian Eagle/Jim Spanarkel/Allie LaForce
 Brian Anderson/Dan Bonner/Marty Snider
 Tim Brando/Mike Gminski/Otis Livingston
 Spero Dedes/Doug Gottlieb/Jaime Maggio

2012

 Studio Hosts: Greg Gumbel and Ernie Johnson Jr. (New York), Matt Winer (Atlanta)
 Studio Analysts: Greg Anthony, Charles Barkley, and Kenny Smith (New York), Seth Davis and Steve Smith (Atlanta)

 Jim Nantz/Clark Kellogg/Tracy Wolfson
 Marv Albert/Steve Kerr/Craig Sager
 Verne Lundquist/Bill Raftery/Lesley Visser
 Kevin Harlan/Reggie Miller and Len Elmore/Marty Snider
 Ian Eagle/Jim Spanarkel/Lewis Johnson
 Brian Anderson/Dan Bonner/David Aldridge
 Tim Brando/Mike Gminski/Otis Livingston
 Spero Dedes/Bob Wenzel/Jaime Maggio

2011

 Studio Hosts: Greg Gumbel and Ernie Johnson Jr. (New York), and Matt Winer (Atlanta)
 Studio Analysts: Greg Anthony, Charles Barkley, and Kenny Smith (New York), Seth Davis and Steve Smith (Atlanta)

 Jim Nantz/Clark Kellogg/Tracy Wolfson
 Marv Albert/Steve Kerr/Craig Sager
 Verne Lundquist/Bill Raftery/Lesley Visser
 Gus Johnson/Len Elmore/Sam Ryan
 Kevin Harlan/Reggie Miller and Dan Bonner/Marty Snider
 Ian Eagle/Jim Spanarkel/David Aldridge
 Tim Brando/Mike Gminski/Lewis Johnson
 Spero Dedes/Bob Wenzel/Jaime Maggio

References

March Madness commentary crews for CBS/Turner
CBS Sports
Turner Sports